Jean Hector Paul Auguste Ghesquière (born 1888) was a Belgian botanist.

Work 
He collected plant specimens in Angola, the Democratic Republic of the Congo, Niger, São Tomé and Príncipe, and Uganda. He deposited many of his specimens in the herbarium at the Botanic Garden Meise (then called the National Botanic Garden of Belgium).

Legacy 
He is the authority for at least 59 taxa including: 
The following species have been named in his honor:

Karschiogomphus ghesquierei Schouteden, 1934 (Syn. of Neurogomphus martininus Lacroix, 1921)
Chlorocypha ghesquierei Fraser, 1959

References 

20th-century Belgian botanists
1888 births
1982 deaths